The 2022 Argentine Primera División - Liga Profesional (officially the Torneo Binance 2022 for sponsorship reasons) was the 132nd season of top-flight professional football in Argentina. The league season began on 3 June and ended on 25 October 2022.

Twenty-eight teams competed in the league: the 26 teams that took part in the previous Primera División season as well as two promoted teams from the 2021 Primera Nacional (Tigre and Barracas Central). River Plate were the defending champions.

On 23 October 2022, Boca Juniors won their 35th national league championship in the last round after they and Independiente drew 2–2 and, simultaneously, River Plate defeated Racing 1–2.

Competition format
The competition was run under a single round-robin, contested by 28 teams (26 from the previous edition plus 2 promoted from Primera Nacional). The champions qualified for the 2023 Copa Libertadores as Argentina 1. The qualification for international tournaments was determined by an aggregate table of the 2022 Primera División and 2022 Copa de la Liga Profesional first stage tournaments.

Club information

Stadia and locations

Personnel

Managerial changes

Interim managers
1.  Sergio Ramos and  Salvador Daniele were interim managers in the 2022 Copa de la Liga Profesional Group stage 4th round.
2.  Gabriel Graciani was interim manager in the 2022 Copa de la Liga Profesional Group stage 5th round.
3.  Javier Gandolfi was interim manager in the 2021–22 Copa Argentina round of 64 and the 2022 Copa de la Liga Profesional Group stage 7th round.
4. Long-term interim manager.
5. Interim manager until the end of the Copa de la Liga Profesional.
6.  Claudio Cabrera was interim manager in the 2021–22 Copa Argentina round of 64.
7.  Favio Fernández and  Diego Villar were interim managers in the 1st and 2nd–5th rounds, respectively.
8.  Germán Rivarola was interim manager in the 3rd–4th rounds.
9.  Adrián Adrover was interim manager in the 7th–9th rounds.
10. Interim manager until the 2022 Trofeo de Campeones de la Liga Profesional final. Ibarra was promoted to manager after the Trofeo de Campeones de la Liga Profesional.
11.  Adrián Marini was interim manager in the 7th round.
12.  Rodrigo Acosta was interim manager in the 7th–10th rounds and the 2021–22 Copa Argentina round of 32.
13.  Claudio Graf and  Juan José Serrizuela were interim managers in the 8th–10th rounds and 11th round, respectively.
14.  Sergio Ramos was interim manager in the 10th–13th rounds.
15.  Adrián Marini was interim manager in the 15th–21nd rounds.
16.  Gustavo Tognarelli was interim manager in the 17th round. Coria was interim manager starting from the 2021–22 Copa Argentina round of 16 until the end of the Liga Profesional.
17. Interim manager until the 2021–22 Copa Argentina final. Gandolfi was promoted to manager after the Copa Argentina.
18.  Nicolás Diez was interim manager in the 19th–20th rounds.
19. Interim manager until the end of the Liga Profesional.
20. Interim manager until the end of the Liga Profesional. Saralegui was promoted to manager after the Liga Profesional.
21.  Cristian Vella and  Leonardo Testone were interim managers in the 24th round.

Foreign players

Players holding Argentinian dual nationality
They do not take up a foreign slot.

 Ezequiel Schelotto (Aldosivi)
 Shayr Mohamed (Arsenal)
 Carlos Lampe (Atlético Tucumán)
 Dylan Gissi (Banfield)
 Norberto Briasco (Boca Juniors)
 Frank Fabra (Boca Juniors)
 Matteo Trombini (Estudiantes (LP))
 Leandro Soria (Godoy Cruz)
 Matías Soria (Godoy Cruz)
 Leandro Benegas (Independiente)
 Alan Soñora (Independiente)
 Julio César Soler (Lanús)
 Gabriel Arias (Racing)
 Nicolás de la Cruz (River Plate)
 David Martínez (River Plate)
 Cristian Báez (Rosario Central)
 Luca Martínez (Rosario Central)
 Néstor Ortigoza (San Lorenzo)
 Andrés Vombergar (San Lorenzo)
 Lenny Lobato (Vélez Sarsfield)

Source: AFA

League table

Results
Teams played every other team once (either at home or away) completing a total of 27 rounds.

Season statistics

Top goalscorers

Source: AFA

Top assists

Source: AFA

International qualification
The 2022 Argentine Primera División champions, 2022 Copa de la Liga Profesional champions and 2021–22 Copa Argentina champions earned a berth to the 2023 Copa Libertadores. The remaining berths to the 2023 Copa Libertadores as well as the ones to the 2023 Copa Sudamericana were determined by an aggregate table of the 2022 Argentine Primera División and 2022 Copa de la Liga Profesional first stage tournaments. The top three teams in the aggregate table not already qualified for any international tournament qualified for the Copa Libertadores, while the next six teams qualified for the Copa Sudamericana.

Aggregate table

Relegation
Relegation at the end of the season was based on coefficients, which take into consideration the points obtained by the clubs during the present season (aggregate table points) and the two previous seasons (only seasons at the top flight are counted). The total tally was then divided by the number of games played in the top flight over those three seasons and an average was calculated. The two teams with the worst average at the end of the season were relegated to Primera Nacional. Relegation was reinstated starting from this season after it was suspended by AFA at the end of the 2019–20 season due to the COVID-19 pandemic.

Source: AFA

References

External links
 LPF official site

Argentine Primera División seasons
2022 in Argentine football